is a Japanese professional footballer who plays as an attacking midfielder for Urawa Red Diamonds.

Honours

Club
Urawa Red Diamonds
Emperor's Cup: 2021

References

External links

1996 births
Living people
Japanese footballers
Association football people from Tokyo
Association football midfielders
FC Ryukyu players
Urawa Red Diamonds players
J2 League players
J1 League players